Bryan Carter (born July 11, 1990 in St. Louis, Missouri) is an American drummer, vocalist, composer, arranger, orchestrator and bandleader.

Early life and education 
Bryan Carter was born in St. Louis, Missouri. He was introduced to the drums by his father at the age of two. He began his formal musical training on the violin at the age of four using the Suzuki method. Bryan was raised in Sycamore, Illinois and attended Sycamore High School. While in high school he was a part of The Gibson/Baldwin Grammy Jazz Ensemble where he met future collaborators Emmet Cohen, Benny Benack III, Grace Kelly, Cody Fry and Chad Lefkowitz-Brown.

Carter attended The Juilliard School in New York City, receiving a Bachelor of Music in 2012.

Career

Music 
Bryan is primarily known for his work in Jazz and Improvisational music. He has performed/recorded with Wynton Marsalis, Jon Batiste, Kenny Barron, McCoy Tyner, Marcus Roberts, Kurt Elling, Kris Bowers, Steven Feifke, Emmet Cohen, Braxton Cook, Marquis Hill, Veronica Swift, Martina DaSilva, Michael Feinstein and Steve Tyrell.

As a bandleader, Bryan tours with his band, “Bryan Carter & The Swangers” which he describes as a diverse semi-acoustic band built upon a foundation of brash eclecticism as well as it’s expanded “concert-driven” counterpart, “The Swangers Orchestra.

Theatre 
In 2012 Bryan was cast in Kyle Riabko’s “What’s it all About: Bacharach Reimagined” musical-workshop where he starred alongside Charlie Rosen, Daniel Bailen, Laura Dreyfuss and Ariana Debose. In 2022, Bryan contributed additional orchestrations to Michael R. Jackson's Pulitzer Prize winning musical, “A Strange Loop”. He is currently co-orchestrating “Some Like It Hot”, an upcoming Broadway musical based on the film of the same name. He has as performed with Tituss Burgess, Laura Osnes, Gavin Creel, Kristin Chenoweth, and Aaron Tveit.

Film/Television 
Bryan served as the house drummer for NBC’s summer variety show “Maya & Marty” starring Maya Rudolph, Martin Short and Keenan Thompson. The show featured special guests in musical segments Jimmy Fallon, Steve Martin and Nick Jonas. In 2021 and 2022 he worked on “The Not-Too-Late Show with Elmo” and “Sesame Street”.

Personal life 
Carter resides in the Hells Kitchen neighborhood of New York City. He identifies as Gay.

Jazz at Pride 
In 2019, Bryan established “Jazz at Pride”—a non-profit organization dedicated to celebrating and creating safe spaces for the LGBTQIA+ community within the jazz community.

Endorsements 
Carter endorses Vic Firth drumsticks, mallets and brushes, Zildjian cymbals, Remo drumheads and Ludwig Drums.

References 

American bandleaders
American drummers
American LGBT musicians
Musicians from St. Louis
LGBT people from Missouri
Juilliard School alumni
1990 births
Living people